William King Harvey (September 13, 1915  – June 9, 1976) was an American Central Intelligence Agency (CIA) officer, best known for his role in the terrorism and sabotage campaign known as Operation Mongoose. He was known as "America's James Bond", a tag given to him by Edward Lansdale.

Background 
Harvey was born on September 13, 1915, in Cleveland, Ohio. He was the son of Sara King Harvey, an English professor at Indiana State Teachers College in Terre Haute. An Eagle Scout, he skipped several grades and graduated from Terre Haute's Wiley High School in 1931.

After working as a printer and reporter at the Danville Gazette (a newspaper owned by his grandfather) from 1931 to 1933, he enrolled in an accelerated program at Indiana University that encompassed two years of undergraduate studies and enabled him to complete an honors LL.B. from the University's School of Law in 1937.

He married Libby McIntire, the daughter of a lawyer from Maysville, Kentucky, but the marriage ended in divorce in 1954. Immediately thereafter, he married Clara Grace "CG" Follick, a former CIA personnel officer who was the first woman to attain the rank of major in the United States Army. From 1960 to 1969, Harvey and his family (including a son from his first marriage and a daughter adopted by Harvey and Follick during his German assignment) were domiciled in Chevy Chase Village, Maryland.

Career 
Harvey joined the Federal Bureau of Investigation in December 1940 and enjoyed a distinguished career (specializing in German and Soviet counterintelligence) throughout World War II and its immediate aftermath. In July 1947, he broke a regulation on being available on two-hour call due to sleeping off heavy drinking at a party the night before. He refused the resulting demotion and reassignment to Indianapolis, Indiana, preferring to resign. He joined the CIA shortly thereafter.

As he plotted to reduce the FBI's overseas powers, his knowledge of the Bureau proved to be invaluable. Along with James Angleton, he became one of the foremost operatives in the secret war against the KGB during the Cold War. According to journalist David Martin, Harvey swiftly gained a reputation for consuming more alcohol than any other person in the United States government; however, no one ever saw him drunk during this period.

Harvey's CIA career began with his founding of Staff D, the electronic surveillance branch of the Clandestine Service Division. In 1951 Harvey's investigation of the career history of Kim Philby, noting suspicious coincidences that suggested he had long been a Soviet agent, saw the CIA demand that Philby be kept out of his position as MI6 liaison; Philby was fired. Six months earlier, Harvey had got into a fight with Guy Burgess at a party after Burgess had drunkenly drawn a lewd cartoon of Harvey's wife.

From 1952 to 1960, Harvey was posted to West Berlin as chief of base, where he led the operation that built a tunnel to the Soviet sector to spy on their communication channels. This operation was called PBJOINTLY. On his return to CIA headquarters, Harvey was tasked with a project to organize "executive actions" (a euphemism for the assassination of foreign political leaders) under the codename ZR/RIFLE. To vanquish Fidel Castro, Harvey decided he needed to employ the resources of the American Mafia. He drew on the connections of businessman and CIA asset Robert Maheu, who had cultivated relationships with Sam Giancana, Santo Trafficante Jr., Johnny Roselli and other figures. Finding Maheu's operation chaotic, Harvey cut everyone but Roselli out, and ran the operations against Castro himself.

Harvey was also involved in Operation Mongoose, a CIA operation run from Miami, Florida that ran various attempts to undermine or overthrow the Cuban Revolution. At the height of the Cuban Missile Crisis in October 1962, Harvey sent ten intelligence operatives into Cuba to gather intelligence and prepare for an invasion Harvey thought inevitable.

The unauthorized operation tarnished Harvey's reputation. Although he was eventually assigned to Rome as station chief in 1963 following a punitive administrative post at CIA headquarters, he failed to acclimate to the milieu and was denied a high-profile assignment in the Laotian Civil War by Richard Helms. Notably, Harvey recommended Colonel Renzo Rocca, chief of the Italian military intelligence Division R, as liaison for building up the Italian component of Operation Gladio in 1964. However, his drinking and health deteriorated, and he was ultimately relieved.

Although Harvey briefly headed a CIA headquarters unit on possible countermeasures to electronic surveillance, he took an extended leave of absence (largely precipitated by his alcoholism and the concurrent fallout from his relationship with Roselli, who had been convicted in an elaborate card-cheating case) throughout much of 1967. He formally retired from the CIA in January 1968. Following a brief law practice in Washington, D.C., Harvey and his family relocated to Indianapolis amid fears of ongoing surveillance in 1969. During this period, he curtailed his alcohol use and edited legal decisions for the Bobbs-Merrill Company.

In 1975, he testified before the Church Committee on some of the CIA's past operations.

Harvey died in Indianapolis on June 9, 1976, from a heart attack, at the age of 60.

Assassination of John F. Kennedy 
After the death of former CIA officer and Watergate figure E. Howard Hunt in 2007, Saint John Hunt and David Hunt revealed that their father had recorded several claims about himself and others being involved in a conspiracy to assassinate John F. Kennedy. In the April 5, 2007, issue of Rolling Stone, Saint John Hunt detailed a number of individuals implicated by his father, including Harvey, Lyndon B. Johnson, Cord Meyer, David Sánchez Morales, David Atlee Phillips, Frank Sturgis, and an assassin he termed "French gunman grassy knoll", who many presume was Lucien Sarti. The two sons alleged that their father excised the information from his memoirs, "American Spy: My Secret History in the CIA, Watergate and Beyond", to avoid possible perjury charges. Hunt's widow and other children told the Los Angeles Times that the two sons took advantage of Hunt's loss of lucidity by coaching and exploiting him for financial gain. The newspaper said it examined the materials offered by the sons to support the story and found them to be "inconclusive."

Further reading

Biography

In fiction 

 In this novel chock full of portrayals of real people, Harvey is one of the few not portrayed under his real name – but he is clearly the basis of the thinly disguised character "Harvey Torriti, a.k.a. the Sorcerer".
Guillaume Dorison (2019). Assassin's Creed: Bloodstone. In this comic book, Harvey is a member of the Assassin Order and secretly a Templar agent. He is also a CIA director and the mentor of Warren Vidic. He was the mastermind behind the Gulf of Tonkin Incident which enabled the Vietnam War.

References 

1915 births
1976 deaths
American spies
Federal Bureau of Investigation agents
People from Cleveland
People from Indiana
People of the Central Intelligence Agency